List of the National Register of Historic Places listings in Ontario County, New York

This is intended to be a complete list of properties and districts listed on the National Register of Historic Places in Ontario County, New York.  The locations of National Register properties and districts (at least for all showing latitude and longitude coordinates below) may be seen in a map by clicking on "Map of all coordinates". One property, Boughton Hill, is further designated a National Historic Landmark.



County-wide listings

|}

See also

 National Register of Historic Places listings in New York

References

Ontario County